Afzelia bipindensis (common name apa) is an economic species of tropical forest tree in the family Fabaceae. It is found in Angola, Cameroon, Central African Republic, Republic of the Congo, Democratic Republic of the Congo, Gabon, Nigeria, and Uganda. It is threatened by habitat loss.

References

bipindensis
Flora of West-Central Tropical Africa
Flora of West Tropical Africa
Flora of Angola
Trees of Africa
Vulnerable plants
Taxonomy articles created by Polbot